The Ithaca Kitty, originally known as "The Tabby Cat", was a popular stuffed toy in the United States which started a fad for plush toys that lasted from its introduction in 1892 until after World War I.

History
The Ithaca Kitty was inspired by a gray tabby cat named Caesar Grimalkin in Ithaca, New York. The cat's owners, William Hazlitt Smith and Celia Smith, had the cat photographed and had Celia's sister-in-law, Charity Smith, paint a likeness of the cat onto a three-piece pattern designed by Celia. Although Grimalkin was a polydactyl cat with seven toes on each front paw, the Smiths felt that five toes appeared more normal and patented the "toy animal figure" in October 1892.

The design was sold by the Smiths for one cent a yard to Arnold Print Works, which then sold the printed pattern as "The Tabby Cat" on half a yard of muslin for ten cents each in late 1892. Nearly 200,000 were sold that first holiday season. The toy was very successful nationwide, making appearances at the 1893 Chicago World's Fair and in the windows of Wanamaker's department store in Philadelphia. The toy's success led to other stuffed animals, including kittens, dogs, and bunnies. The Ithaca Kitty was especially known for its lifelike appearance and was allegedly used by farmers to scare away birds and by the Central Park police station to scare mice.

Writer Eugene Field said that the calico cat in his poem "The Duel" was inspired by the Ithaca Kitty.

See also 

 Teddy bear
 Sock monkey
 Beanie baby

References

1890s toys
Individual cats
Ithaca, New York
Products introduced in 1892
Stuffed toys
Toy animals